Constance Cummings-John (1918 – 21 February 2000) was a Sierra Leonean educationist and politician. She was the first woman in Africa to join a municipal council and in 1966 became the first woman to serve as mayor of Freetown. She was based in London, England, for the latter part of her life.

Biography

Early years and education; London and New York
She was born Constance Agatha Horton into an influential Creole family, black migrants to West Africa from the Americas in the 18th century who by the 20th century had become intellectuals, business people, and members of the professions. Her father, John William Horton (1861–1916), was city treasurer of Freetown, while her mother, Regina Horton, née Awoonor-Wilson, was a concert pianist.

Constance herself went to London in 1935, aged 17, to train as a schoolteacher. While there she joined the West African Students' Union and the League of Coloured Peoples. Having gained her teaching certificate, she took up further studies in the United States at Cornell University.

When she returned to London she joined the International African Service Bureau, under the leadership of George Padmore, and married Ethnan Cummings-John, a radical lawyer. In 1937 she returned to Freetown as principal of the African Methodist Episcopal Girls' Industrial School, but her political activities caused her great problems with the British Colonial Office. During the Second World War she established a mining company, which later became an important source of funds for her educational projects.

Between 1946 and 1951 she lived in New York City, where her brother Asadata Dafora Horton was a successful musician and dancer. While living in the US, she worked in hospitals and served on the executives of the American Council for African Education and the Council on African Affairs, the second of which was chaired by Paul Robeson.

Return to Freetown
On her return to Freetown in 1951 Cummings joined the Sierra Leone People's Party. She helped found the Sierra Leone Women's Movement in 1951. She also founded a new school for girls, the Eleanor Roosevelt School, which by 1953 had more than 600 students. During these years Cummings-John gained a licenciate from the London College of Preceptors, and in 1952 the Governor of Sierra Leone, Sir George Beresford-Stooke, appointed her to the Freetown Council. At the general election of 1957 she was one of two women elected to the new House of Representatives, even though women did not yet have the franchise. The Krio-led opposition then successfully demanded the resignation of both women, but the next year Cummings-John was elected to the Freetown Municipal Council.

In 1961, with the independence of Sierra Leone, Cummings-John's husband became the new country's ambassador to Liberia. In 1966 Prime Minister Albert Margai appointed her as Mayor of Freetown, in succession to Siaka Stevens, but she held the position for only a few months. Her party lost the general election of 1966, and there was then a successful military coup against the new government. Cummings-John was herself accused of financial corruption while outside the country and was advised not to return.

Political activity in London
She settled again in London, where she became an active member of the Labour Party and the Campaign for Nuclear Disarmament and also a school governor.

Cummings-John was a member of political organizations in the United Kingdom and the United States as well as in Sierra Leone, and she and I. T. A. Wallace-Johnson were the only Krio to fight for the participation of the indigenous "Protectorate peoples" in West African political processes. Her actions also led to the formation of the Sierra Leone Market Women's Union and a Washerwoman's Union.

Despite unsuccessful attempts to return to Sierra Leone in 1974 and 1996, Cummings-John lived the rest of her life in London. In 1995 she published an autobiography. She died in London on 21 February 2000 at the age of 82.

Publications
Memoirs of a Krio Leader (Ibadan: Sam Bookman Educational, 1995).

References

1918 births
2000 deaths
20th-century Sierra Leonean women politicians
20th-century Sierra Leonean politicians
Sierra Leonean city councillors
Cornell University alumni
Mayors of Freetown
Sierra Leone Creole people
Sierra Leonean educators
Women mayors of places in Sierra Leone
Sierra Leonean expatriates in the United Kingdom
Sierra Leonean expatriates in the United States
Sierra Leoneans of Jamaican Maroon descent